was a Japanese Buddhist monk and waka poet of the Nanbokuchō period. His secular name (俗名) was Ōtomo Yoriyasu (大友頼資).
== Poetry ==
Four of his waka were included in imperial anthologies such as the Shinshūi Wakashū and the Shingoshūi Wakashū.

Other writings 
He wrote the travel diary Miyako no Tsuto (都のつと).

References

Citations

Works cited

General references 
 

Date of birth unknown
Japanese Buddhist clergy
Waka poets
Samurai
14th-century Japanese poets